The ritual of oak and mistletoe is a Celtic religious ceremony, in which white-clad druids climbed a sacred oak, cut down the mistletoe growing on it, sacrificed two white bulls and used the mistletoe to make an elixir to cure infertility and the effects of poison. The ritual, known from a single passage in Pliny's Natural History, has helped shape the image of the druid in the popular imagination.

Account by Pliny the Elder
The only extant source for this ritual is a passage in the Natural History by Roman historian Pliny the Elder, written in the 1st century AD. Speaking of mistletoe, he writes:

While Pliny does not indicate the source on which he based this account, French archaeologist Jean-Louis Brunaux (fr) has argued for Posidonius of Rhodes, a polymath who flourished in the 1st century BC.

Later influence and historiography

Miranda Aldhouse-Green has argued that, although Pliny is the only authority to mention this ceremony, the main elements of his account are all features of Celtic religion that are confirmed elsewhere; these include oak trees, mistletoe, ritual banqueting, the moon, and bull-sacrifice. 

Pliny's account has been considered to have contributed largely to the popular depiction of druids today, as white-clad wise men performing sacrifices in the forests and equipped with golden sickles. 

Chateaubriand incorporated a dramatized version of Pliny's scene in his Les Martyrs, in which the druidess Veleda plays a part. In the Astérix comics, the druid Getafix is often depicted among oak trees, robed in white, and bearing a golden sickle.

The ritual is a key plot element in Silver on the Tree, the last book of Susan Cooper's The Dark is Rising Sequence.

Notes

References
 
 
 

Druidry